A History of Sport Fishing is the first studio album by American indie rock band Thee More Shallows. It was released on Monotreme Records and Megalon Records in 2002.

Early copies of the album have a sticker over the band's former name, "Thee Shallows". This is because a cease-and-desist order was issued after the band was contacted by Brian Gregory from the band The Shallows. Subsequent printings of the album feature a completely new cover.

Critical reception
Brian Way of AllMusic gave the album 4 stars out of 5, saying: "It's the unstrained subtlety and understatement of the songs collected here that make A History of Sport Fishing such a rewarding listening experience and set the stage for the albums to come." Joe Tangari of Pitchfork gave the album a 6.0 out of 10, saying, "though almost uniformly pleasant, A History of Sport Fishing seldom casts a truly strong hook to reel you into its world."

Track listing

References

External links
 

2002 debut albums
Thee More Shallows albums